Joaquín Garrido (born 17 May 1952) is a Mexican actor.

Filmography

Films

Television

References

External links 

Living people
1952 births
20th-century Mexican male actors
21st-century Mexican male actors
Mexican male telenovela actors
Mexican male film actors
Male actors from Mexico City